Tonprojektion is a standalone digital record label founded late 2003 
by the artist Reststrom from Germany.
The headquarters is in Berlin.
 
Distributed via Zebralution, since 2007 part of Warner Music Group (WMG).

In October 2015 the label signed an international licensing deal with AWAL.

External links 
 Official site
 Tonprojektion at Discogs.com

German record labels